Guarea casimiriana is a species of plant in the family Meliaceae. It is endemic to Peru.

References

casimiriana
Flora of Peru
Vulnerable plants
Taxonomy articles created by Polbot